Anna Yuryevna Pletnyova (born 21 August 1977) is a Russian singer, composer, and songwriter. An ex-member of the Russian pop-group Litsey (from 1997 to 2005), Pletnyova has been a member of the pop-group Vintage since 2006. In 2016, she left Vintage and started a solo career.

Pletnyova has been included several times in the "Top 100 Sexiest Women in the World" of the Russian edition of FHM, including rankings on the 7th place in both 2012 and 2014, as well as 8th place in 2015. Alongside her singing career, Pletnyova was the director of Russian TV series Kadetstvo (Кадетство) and Kremlyovskie kursanty (Кремлёвские курсанты).

Discography

With Litsey 
Albums
 "Живая коллекция" — 1998
 "Небо" — 1999
 "Ты стала другой" — 2000
 "Двери открой" — 2003
 "44 минуты" — 2005

Songs as lead vocalist
 "Больше, чем любить" (also songwriter)
 "Листья" (also composer and songwriter)
 "Люби и не теряй" (also composer and songwriter)
 "Плачь небо" (also songwriter)

With Vintage 
Albums
 "Криминальная любовь" (CD; Velvet Music; 2007)
 "SEX" (CD; Velvet Music; 2009)
 "Анечка" (CD; Velvet Music; 2011)
 "Very Dance" (CD;Velvet Music; 2013)
 "Light (EP) Best of" (CD; Velvet Music; 2014)
 "Микки (EP) Best of" (CD; Velvet Music; 2014)
 "Decamerone" (CD; Velvet Music; 2014)
 "Винтаж. LIVE 1.0" (2015)

Singles
 Мама Мия" (radio airplay; Velvet Music; 2006)
 "10 поцелуев" (новогодняя версия; radio airplay; Velvet Music; 2006)
 "Мама Мия" (Radio Edit) — re-release (radio airplay; Velvet Music; 2007)
 "Целься" (radio airplay; Velvet Music; 2007)
 "Всего хорошего" (CD, radio airplay; Velvet Music; 2007)
 "Плохая девочка" (CD, radio airplay; Velvet Music; 2008)
 "Одиночество любви" (radio airplay; Velvet Music; August 2008)
 "Ева" (CD, radio airplay; Velvet Music; 2009)
 "Девочки-лунатики" (CD, radio airplay; Velvet Music; 2009)
 "Victoria" (radio airplay; Velvet Music; 2010)
 "Микки" (CD, Radio airplay; Velvet Music; April 2010)
 "Роман" (Radio airplay, September 2010)
 "Мама-Америка" (Radio airplay, February 2011)
 "Деревья" (Radio airplay, October 2011)
 "Москва" (Radio airplay; January 2012)
 "Нанана" (Radio airplay; May 2012)
 "Отпусти меня" (feat. Doстучаться Do Nебес; radio airplay; August 2012)
 "Танцуй в последний раз" (feat. Roma Kenga; promotional single; Radio airplay; October 2012)
 "Свежая вода" (Radio airplay; November 2012)
 "Знак Водолея" (Radio airplay; April 2013)
 "Три желания" (Radio airplay; October 2013)
 "Когда рядом ты" (Radio airplay; April 2014)
 "Дыши" (Radio airplay; January 2015)
 "Я верю в любовь" (Radio airplay; August 2015)
 "Город, где сбываются мечты" (Radio airplay; November 2015)
 "Сны" (OST"Сны"; январь 2016)
 "Немного рекламы" (Radio airplay; February 2016)

Solo 
Albums

Сильная Девочка (2018)
Синематик (2019)

Charts

Singles 

Key: "«—" did not charted

Note: From 1 January 2011, TopHit General chart was divided into: Russian Top-100 and Ukrainian Top-100. Until 2011, there are no positions for Russian Top-100, because the chart was not formed yet at that time. The best position for song «Роман» is shown only for 2011.

Note: "2М" chart was compiled once in two weeks on the basis of the certified sales of songs in internet markets, mobile services, and based on streaming (free audition) of the track in Russia.

Note: «Red Star» sales chart was compiled monthly only for Russian-language songs. It was based on data received from the Russian version of Billboard magazine and included digital sales, but also sales of album tracks.

Promotional singles

Other songs in charts 

Key: «—" did not charted

Note: «Red Star» sales chart was compiled monthly only for Russian-language songs. It was based on data received from the Russian version of Billboard magazine and included digital sales, but also sales of album tracks.

Videos

As Vintage 
 2006 — "Мама Мiа»
 2007 — "Целься" 
 2007 — "Всего хорошего»
 2008 — "Плохая девочка" with Elena Korikova
 2008 — "Одиночество любви»
 2009 — "Ева»
 2009 — "Девочки-лунатики»
 2009 — "Виктория»
 2010 — "Микки»
 2010 — "Роман»
 2011 — "Мама-Америка»
 2011 — "Мальчик»
 2011 — "Деревья" 
 2012 — "Москва" with DJ Smash
 2012 — "Нанана»
 2012 — "Танцуй в последний раз" with Roma Kenga
 2012 — "Свежая вода»
 2013 — "Play»
 2013 — "Знак водолея»
 2013 — "Три желания" with DJ Smash
 2014 — "Когда рядом ты»
 2015 — "Дыши»
 2015 — "Я верю в в любовь" with DJ M.E.G.
 2015 — "Город, где сбываются мечты" with DJ Smash
 2016 — "Сны»
 2016 — "Немного рекламы" (feat. Clan Soprano)
 2020 — "Из Токио"

As Anna Pletnyova 
 2016 — "Сильная девочка"
 2017 — "Подруга"
 2017 — "На чьей ты стороне?"
 2017 — "Игрушки"
 2017 — "Лалалэнд"
 2018 — "Белая"
 2018 — "Воскресный ангел"
 2019 — "Интуиция"
 2019 — "Преступление и наказание"

References

External links 
 

1977 births
Living people
20th-century Russian singers
21st-century Russian singers
20th-century Russian women singers
21st-century Russian women singers
Russian composers
Russian people of Armenian descent
Russian people of Jewish descent
Russian people of Polish descent
Russian pop singers
Russian singer-songwriters
Russian women singer-songwriters
Singers from Moscow
Winners of the Golden Gramophone Award